The Wine Museum (Muzey na vinoto) is a museum of wine and viticulture located in Pleven, a city in north central Bulgaria.

The museum was the result of a collaboration between Bulgarian and French architects, designers and oenologists, as well as curators from the Pleven Panorama and the Pleven Regional Historical Museum.

The Wine Museum's collection includes over 6,000 bottles of Bulgarian wine from all viticultural regions of the country, which are available for tasting and purchase. In addition, the museum boasts the country's largest collection of over 7,000 old wines (ranging from 30 to 90 years in age). The museum's historical hall exhibits items related to vine growing and wine making in the Bulgarian lands from ancient Thracian times until today. The wine cellar offers wines from all Bulgarian regions stored in 100 wine barrels made of French oak. The museum's wine collection is owned by Plamen Petkov, a major local vineyard owner, who has invested over $300,000 in temperature control systems, flooring and lighting for the cave which houses the museum.

Pleven is located in the heart of a major vine-growing region, the Danubian Plain. The city is also a centre of wine-related education, as it is the home of Bulgaria's first and only specialized high school, the Aleksandar Stamboliyski Professional High School of Vine Growing and Wine Making, established in 1890. The National Institute of Viticulture and Oenology, founded in 1902 at the recommendation of French wine specialist Pierre Viala, is also located in Pleven.

See also

 List of food and beverage museums

References

Museums established in 2008
Buildings and structures in Pleven
Landforms of Pleven Province
Museums in Pleven Province
Caves of Bulgaria
Wine museums